The London and North Western Railway (LNWR, L&NWR) was a British railway company between 1846 and 1922. In the late 19th century, the L&NWR was the largest joint stock company in the United Kingdom.

In 1923, it became a constituent of the London, Midland and Scottish (LMS) railway, and, in 1948, the London Midland Region of British Railways: the LNWR is effectively an ancestor of today's West Coast Main Line.

History

The company was formed on 16 July 1846 by the amalgamation of the Grand Junction Railway, London and Birmingham Railway and the Manchester and Birmingham Railway. This move was prompted, in part, by the Great Western Railway's plans for a railway north from Oxford to Birmingham.

The headquarters were at Euston railway station. As traffic increased, it was greatly expanded with the opening in 1849 of the Great Hall, designed by Philip Charles Hardwick in classical style. The station stood on Drummond Street. Further expansion resulted in two additional platforms in the 1870s with four more in the 1890s, bringing the total to 15.

The LNWR described itself as the Premier Line. This was justified, as it included the pioneering Liverpool and Manchester Railway of 1830 and the original LNWR main line linking London, Birmingham and Lancashire had been the first big railway in Britain, opened throughout in 1838. As the largest joint stock company in the United Kingdom, it collected a greater revenue than any other railway company of its era.

With the Grand Junction Railway acquisition of the North Union Railway in 1846, the London and North Western Railway operated as far north as Preston. In 1859, the Lancaster and Preston Junction Railway amalgamated with the Lancaster and Carlisle Railway and this combined enterprise was leased to the London and North Western Railway, giving it a direct route from London to Carlisle.

In 1858, they merged with the Chester and Holyhead Railway and became responsible for the lucrative Irish Mail trains via the North Wales Main Line to Holyhead and handled the Irish Mail.

On 1 February 1859, the company launched the limited mail service, which was only allowed to take three passenger coaches, one each for Glasgow, Edinburgh and Perth. The Postmaster General was always willing to allow a fourth coach, provided the increased weight did not cause time to be lost in running. The train was timed to leave Euston at 20.30 and operated until the institution of a dedicated post train, wholly of Post Office vehicles, in 1885. On 1 October 1873 the first sleeping carriage ran between Euston and Glasgow, attached to the limited mail. It ran three nights a week in each direction. On 1 February 1874 a second carriage was provided and the service ran every night.

In 1860, the company pioneered the use of the water trough designed by John Ramsbottom. It was introduced on a section of level track at Mochdre, between Llandudno Junction and Colwyn Bay.

The company inherited a number of manufacturing facilities from the companies with which it merged, but these were consolidated and in 1862, locomotive construction and maintenance was done at the Crewe Locomotive Works, carriage building was done at Wolverton and wagon building was concentrated at Earlestown.

At the core of the LNWR system was the main line network connecting London Euston with the major cities of Birmingham, Liverpool and Manchester, and (through co-operation with the Caledonian Railway) Edinburgh and Glasgow. This route is today known as the West Coast Main Line. A ferry service also linked Holyhead to Greenore in County Louth, where the LNWR owned the  Dundalk, Newry and Greenore Railway, which connected to other lines of the Irish mainline network at Dundalk and Newry.

The LNWR also had a main line connecting Liverpool and Manchester with Leeds, and secondary routes extending to Nottingham, Derby, Peterborough and South Wales.

In 1913, the company achieved a total revenue of £17,219,060 with working expenses of £11,322,164.

On 1 January 1922, one year before it amalgamated with other railways to create the London, Midland and Scottish Railway (LMS), the LNWR amalgamated with the Lancashire and Yorkshire Railway (including its subsidiary the Dearne Valley Railway) and at the same time absorbed the North London Railway and the Shropshire Union Railways and Canal Company, both of which were previously controlled by the LNWR.

The company built a war memorial in the form of an obelisk outside Euston station to commemorate the 3,719 of its employees who died in the First World War. Following the Second World War, the names of the LMS's casualties were added to the LNWR's memorial.

Electrification

From 1909 to 1922, the LNWR undertook a large-scale project to electrify the whole of its London inner-suburban network.
The London and North Western Railway London inner-suburban network, encompassed the lines from London Broad Street to Richmond, London Euston to Watford, with branch lines such as Watford to Croxley Green. There were also links to the District Railway at Earl's Court and over the route to Richmond. With the Bakerloo Tube Line being extended over the Watford DC lines, the railway was electrified at 630 V DC fourth rail. The electricity was generated at the LNWR's power station in Stonebridge Park and a depot built at Croxley Green.

Successors
The LNWR became a constituent of the London, Midland and Scottish (LMS) railway when the railways of Great Britain were merged in the grouping of 1923. Ex-LNWR lines formed the core of the LMS's Western Division.

Nationalisation followed in 1948, with the English and Welsh lines of the LMS becoming the London Midland Region of British Railways. Some former LNWR routes were subsequently closed, notably the lines running East to West across the Midlands (e.g. These were electrified in the 1960s and 1970s, and further upgraded in the 1990s and 2000s, with trains now running at up to 125 mph. Other LNWR lines survive as part of commuter networks around major cities such as Birmingham and Manchester. In 2017 it was announced that the new franchisee for the West Midlands and semi-fast West Coast services between London and North West England would utilise the brand London Northwestern Railway as an homage to the LNWR.

Acquisitions

Locomotives

The LNWR's main engineering works were at Crewe (locomotives), Wolverton (carriages) and Earlestown (wagons). Locomotives were usually painted green at first, but in 1873 black was adopted as the standard livery. This finish has been described as "blackberry black".

Accidents and incidents
Major accidents on the LNWR include:-
On 26 March 1850, the boiler of a locomotive exploded at Wolverton, Buckinghamshire due to the tampering of the safety valves. One person was injured.
On 30 April 1851 a train returning from Chester Races broke down in Sutton tunnel, and the following train ran into it. Six passengers were killed.
On 6 September 1851 a train run for the Great Exhibition returning from Euston to Oxford derailed at Bicester and six passengers were killed.
On 6 March 1853, the boiler of a locomotive exploded at Longsight, Lancashire. Six people were killed and the engine shed was severely damaged.
On 27 August 1860 a passenger train collided with a goods train at Craven Arms and one passenger was killed.
On 16 November 1860 the Irish night mail ran into a cattle train at Atherstone. The fireman of the mail train, and nine drovers in the cattle train were killed.
On 11 June 1861, a cast-iron bridge collapsed under a freight train at Leek Wootton, Warwickshire. Both engine crew were killed.
On 2 September 1861 a ballast train came out of a siding onto the main line just past Kentish Town Junction without the signalman's permission, and an excursion train from Kew ran past the signals and collided with it, resulting in the deaths of fourteen passengers and two employees.
On 29 June 1867, a passenger train ran into the rear of a coal train at Warrington, Cheshire due to a pointsman's error which was compounded by the lack of interlocking between points and signals. Eight people were killed and 33 were injured.
The wagons subsequently collided with the Irish Mail at Abergele, Denbighshire. Kerosene being carried in the wagons set the wreck on fire. Thirty-three people were killed in what was then the deadliest rail accident to have occurred in the United Kingdom.
On 14 September 1870, a mail train was diverted into a siding at  station, Staffordshire due to a signalman's error. The train crashed through the buffers and ended up in the River Anker, killing three people.
In 1870, a North Eastern Railway freight train overran signals and collided with a passenger train at St. Nicholas Crossing, Carlisle, Cumberland. Five people were killed. The driver of the freight train was intoxicated.
On 26 November 1870, a mail train was in a rear-end collision with a freight train at Harrow, Middlesex. Eight people were killed.
On 2 August 1873, a passenger train derailed at Wigan, Lancashire due to excessive speed. Thirteen people were killed and 30 were injured.
It was run into by an express passenger train, which was derailed. Fourteen people were killed and 48 were injured.
One person was killed.
On 12 January 1899, An express freight train was derailed at Penmaenmawr, Caernarfonshire due to the trackbed being washed away by the sea during a storm. Both locomotive crew were killed.
Eighteen people were killed.
On 19 August 1909, a passenger train was derailed at Friezland, West Yorkshire. Two people were killed.
Three people were killed and more than 40 were injured.
On 17 September 1912, the driver of an express train misread signals at Ditton Junction, Cheshire. The train was derailed when it ran over points at an excessive speed. Fifteen people were killed.
On 14 August 1915, an express passenger train was derailed at Weedon, Northamptonshire due to a locomotive defect. Ten people were killed and 21 were injured.
On 11 November 1921, the boiler of a locomotive exploded at Buxton, Derbyshire. Two people were killed.

Minor incidents include:-
In 1900, wagons of a permanent way train carrying sleepers were set on fire by the heat of the sun at Earlestown, Lancashire, destroying a number of them.

Ships

The LNWR operated a number of ships on Irish Sea crossings between Holyhead and Dublin, Howth, Kingstown or Greenore. At Greenore, the LNWR built and operated the Dundalk, Newry and Greenore Railway to link the port with the Belfast–Dublin line operated by the Great Northern Railway.

The LNWR also operated a joint service with the Lancashire & Yorkshire Railway from Fleetwood to Belfast and Derry.

Notable people

Chairmen of the Board of Directors

 1846–1852 – George Glyn, later 1st Baron Wolverton
 1852–1853 – Major-General George Anson
 1853–1861 – Marquess of Chandos, later 3rd Duke of Buckingham and Chandos
 1861 – Admiral Constantine Richard Moorsom
 1861–1891 – Richard Moon, Sir Richard Moon from 1887
 1891–1911 – The Lord Stalbridge
 1911–1921 – Gilbert Claughton, Sir Gilbert Claughton from 1912
 1921–1923 – Hon. Charles N. Lawrence, later Baron Lawrence of Kingsgate

Members of the Board of Directors

 John Pares Bickersteth
 Michael Linning Melville
Frederick Baynes
 Henry Booth
 John Albert Bright
 Ralph Brocklebank
 Sir Thomas Brooke, 1st Baronet
 Philip Henry Chambres
 William E. Dorrington
 Edmund Faber, 1st Baron Faber
 Alfred Fletcher
 Samuel Robert Graves
 Rupert Guinness, 2nd Earl of Iveagh
 Theodore Julius Hare
 John Hick
 The Hon. A. H. Holland-Hibbert
 Sir William Houldsworth, 1st Baronet
 J. Bruce Ismay
 Lieut-Col. Amelius Lockwood, 1st Baron Lambourne
 The Hon. William Lowther
 Brigadier-General Lewis Vivian Loyd
 Miles MacInnes
 Edward Nettlefold
 David Plunket, 1st Baron Rathmore
 Cromartie Sutherland-Leveson-Gower, 4th Duke of Sutherland
 Henry Ward

General Managers

 1846–1858 – Captain Mark Huish
 1858–1874 – William Cawkwell
 1874–1893 – Sir George Findlay (knighted 1892)
 1893–1908 – Sir Frederick Harrison (knighted in 1902)
 1909–1914 – Sir Frank Ree (knighted 1913)
 1914      – Sir Robert Turnbull (knighted 1913)
 1914–1919 – Sir Guy Calthrop (made a baronet 1918)
 1919–1920 – Isaac Thomas Williams (knighted c.1919)
 1920–1923 – Arthur Watson

Chief Civil Engineers
Robert Stephenson until 1859
William Baker 1859 – 1878
Francis Stevenson 1879 – 1902
Edward Baylies Thornhill 1902 – 1909
Ernest Frederic Crosbie Trench 1909 – 1923 (afterwards chief engineer of the London, Midland and Scottish Railway)

Locomotive Superintendents and Chief Mechanical Engineers
Southern Division:
 1846–1847 – Edward Bury
 1847–1862 – James McConnell

North Eastern Division:
 1846–1857 – John Ramsbottom
NE Division became part of N Division in 1857.

Northern Division:
 1846–1857 – Francis Trevithick
 1857–1862 – John Ramsbottom

Northern and Southern Divisions amalgamated from April 1862:
 1862–1871 – John Ramsbottom
 1871–1903 – Francis William Webb
 1903–1909 – George Whale
 1909–1920 – Charles Bowen Cooke
 1920–1921 – Hewitt Pearson Montague Beames
 1922 – George Hughes (ex-Lancashire and Yorkshire Railway)

Solicitors
 1830–1861 – Samuel Carter, with continuing role for subsidiary companies

Preservation
 Sections of the former L&NWR are preserved as the Battlefield Line Railway, Nene Valley Railway and Northampton & Lamport Railway, the latter giving the name Premier Line to its quarterly journal.
 A section of the former L&NWR line and station buildings are preserved at Quainton near Aylesbury. It is administered by the Buckinghamshire Railway preservation Society and houses some original L&NWR rolling stock in the former Oxford Rewley Road station. It regularly runs steam trains using various locomotives.

See also
Great Northern and London and North Western Joint Railway
Nickey Line
Croxley Rail Link
Rail transport in Great Britain

References

Reed, M. C. (1996). The London & North Western Railway. Penryn: Atlantic Transport.

Further reading

, 1861 edition

External links

 
 , Registered Charity L&NWR Society No. 1110210

 
Railway companies established in 1846
Railway companies disestablished in 1923
Pre-grouping British railway companies
London, Midland and Scottish Railway constituents
1846 establishments in England
1923 disestablishments in England
British companies disestablished in 1923
British companies established in 1846